Marian Sulzberger Heiskell (born Marian Effie Sulzberger; December 31, 1918March 14, 2019) was an American newspaper executive, philanthropist and former owner of the New York Times.

Early life
She was born Marian Effie Sulzberger on December 31, 1918 in Manhattan, New York to parents Arthur Hays Sulzberger and Iphigene Sulzberger (née Ochs). She was the sister of Ruth Sulzberger Holmberg, Judith Sulzberger and Arthur Ochs "Punch" Sulzberger.

Her first marriage was to Orvil E. Dryfoos in 1941.  They had three children. She later married Andrew Heiskell, who was at the time the chairman of Time Inc., in 1965.

Career
Heiskell was known for her work in publishing, conservation and philanthropy. As a member of the Sulzberger family that controls the New York Times, she became a director of the Times in 1963, holding the position for 34 years. Outside of the New York Times, she was also credited for having originated the concept for People Magazine.

In the area of conservation, she founded the Council on the Environment of New York City, now known as Grow NYC, in 1970. Heiskell was a chairwoman of the National Parks of New York Harbor Conservancy.

From 1990 to 2012, she was the chairwoman of New 42nd Street, a non-profit organization dedicated to revitalizing New York's 42nd Street Theater District.

She was a board member of The New York Botanical Garden, New Yorkers for Parks, Audubon New York, and the Community Service Society of New York.

Awards
In 2004, Heiskel received the Thomas W. Keesee, Jr. Conservation Award, followed by the Rachel Carson Award in 2013, both given by the Audubon Society. In 2005 she received the Land Conservation award from the Open Space Institute. In 2018 she received the Federal Hall Medal for Leadership from the New York Harbor Parks Conservancy, an organization she had played a role in founding.

References

1918 births
2019 deaths
Sulzberger family
American women philanthropists
20th-century American philanthropists
21st-century philanthropists
Philanthropists from New York (state)
People from Manhattan
American centenarians
American people of German-Jewish descent
Women centenarians
20th-century women philanthropists
21st-century women philanthropists